Pépito Elhorga (born on 6 January 1978) is a former French rugby player. He played for Aviron Bayonnais in the Top 14 club competition, and previously played for Biarritz Olympique and SU Agen.

He was a member of France's 2003 Rugby World Cup squad. He had 18 caps, from 2001 to 2008, and scored 3 tries (15 points).

References

External links
Pépito Elhorga International Statistics

1978 births
French rugby union players
Living people
Rugby union wings
Biarritz Olympique players
Ivorian rugby union players
Ivorian emigrants to France
French-Basque people
France international rugby union players
People from Agboville